Chamaesphecia chalciformis is a moth of the family Sesiidae. It is found in Italy, Austria, Slovakia, the Balkan Peninsula, Ukraine, Russia, Turkey, the Middle East and northern Iran.

The larvae feed on Origanum vulgare.

References

Moths described in 1804
Sesiidae
Moths of Europe
Insects of Turkey